Mount Mort is a rural locality in the City of Ipswich, Queensland, Australia.

Geography 
Western Creek, a tributary of the Bremer River, and Franklyn Vale Homestead are both found in Mount Mort.

History 
In 1877,  were resumed from the Franklyn Vale pastoral run and offered for selection on 17 April 1877.

The locality was originally known as Gehrkevale after Carl Frederick Wilhelm Gehrke who purchased  circa 1881 and subsequently purchased a further . However, during World War I due to anti-German sentiment, the name was changed to Mount Mort, after the Mort family who settled there in 1849.

Gehrkevale Provisional School opened on 18 January 1904. On 1 January 1909 it became Gehrkevale State School. In May 1917 it was renamed Mount Mort State School. It closed on 18 September 1959.

Heritage listings 
Mount Mort has a number of heritage-listed sites, including:
 Franklin Vale Road: Franklyn Vale Homestead

See also 

 List of Australian place names changed from German names

References

External links

 
City of Ipswich
Localities in Queensland